Baytown may refer to:

Baytown, Texas, a city in the United States near Houston, Texas
Baytown culture, an archaeological culture in the United States
Operation Baytown, British invasion of Italy in 1943 during World War I